The Extraordinary and Plenipotentiary Ambassador of Peru to the State of Japan is the official representative of the Republic of Peru to Japan. Until 1971, the Ambassador to Japan was also accredited to China.

Both countries established relations in 1873, and 790 Japanese immigrants arrived to Peru 20 years later in 1899. Today, Peru has the second largest Japanese population in Latin America after Brazil.

Relations have been warm, although incidents have occurred. Before the establishment of relations, a diplomatic incident occurred between both countries, and after Alberto Fujimori (whose presidency was marked by events such as the Japanese embassy hostage crisis) faxed his resignation to the Presidency of Peru, Japan refused to extradite him as he had become a Japanese citizen, only arrested in Chile after his attempt to return to Peru. Peru severed relations with Japan only once, in January 1942, due to the Attack on Pearl Harbor during World War II.

List of ambassadors

See also
List of ambassadors of Peru to China

References

Japan
Peru